La becerrada is a 1963 Spanish comedy film directed by José María Forqué, written by Jaime de Armiñán and Ricardo Muñoz Suay, and starring Fernando Fernán Gómez, Amparo Soler Leal and . It was composed by Graciano Tarrago.

Cast

References

External links
 

Spanish comedy films
1963 comedy films
1963 films
Films directed by José María Forqué
Films produced by Nazario Belmar
Films with screenplays by Jaime de Armiñán
Films with screenplays by Ricardo Muñoz Suay
Films shot in Spain